Saharanpuri ( / , Sahāranpūrī) is a nisbat or surname derived from the name of the city of Saharanpur in India. The Arabic form is as-Saharanfuri ( / , as-Sahāranfūrī) or as-Saharanburi ( / , as-Sahāranbūrī).

List of persons with the name
Ahmad Ali Saharanpuri
Khalil Ahmad Anbahtawi Saharanpuri
Muhammad Zakariya Kandhlawi Saharanpuri

Toponymic surnames

Indian surnames
Surnames of Indian origin
Urdu-language surnames
Nisbas
Arabic-language surnames